Paolo Mavolo (born 6 March 1992) is a Hungarian forward who currently plays for Olajmunkás SE Gellénháza.

External links 
 
 Paolo Mavolo at HLSZ 
 Paolo Mavolo at ÖFB

1992 births
Living people
Hungarian people of Italian descent
Hungarian footballers
Hungarian expatriate footballers
Association football midfielders
Zalaegerszegi TE players
Nemzeti Bajnokság I players
Nemzeti Bajnokság II players
Hungarian expatriate sportspeople in Austria
Expatriate footballers in Austria